Apple Springs High School is a public high school located in Apple Springs, Texas (United States) and classified as a 1A school by the UIL.  It is part of the Apple Springs Independent School District located in northeast Trinity County.  In 2015, the school was rated "Met Standard" by the Texas Education Agency.

Unique Relationship

The school has a unique relationship with the nearby Hudson Independent School District. Apple Springs participates in six-man football but does not offer a band program, while Hudson has a band but does not participate in football. Therefore, the Hudson band participates at Apple Springs games. The unusual relationship was filmed by the crew of the popular Texas Country Reporter.

Athletics
The Apple Springs Eagles compete in these sports - 

Cross Country, Volleyball, 6-Man Football, Basketball, Track, Softball & Baseball

State Titles
Baseball - 
1988(1A)

References

External links
Apple Springs ISD

Public high schools in Texas
Schools in Trinity County, Texas